Nicholas is a 1958 Brazilian telenovela adapted from A. J. Cronin's 1950 novel, The Spanish Gardener.  The series was directed by Julio Gouveia, the head of The Theatre School of São Paulo.  It starred Ricardinho as Nicholas, and Roberto de Cleto as the gardener.  The British film adaptation was released in 1956, and TV Tupi broadcast another Brazilian adaptation of Cronin's novel in 1967.

External links 
Webpage about O Jardineiro Espanhol (in Portuguese)

(1967 Brazilian telenovela)
 

1958 telenovelas
Brazilian telenovelas
Television shows based on British novels
1958 Brazilian television series debuts
1960s Brazilian television series
1970s Brazilian television series
1980s Brazilian television series
1990s Brazilian television series
2000s Brazilian television series
2010s Brazilian television series
2020s Brazilian television series
Television shows based on works by A. J. Cronin